Arzan may refer to:

Arzen or Arzan, ancient and medieval city on the border zone between Upper Mesopotamia and the Armenian Highlands, in eastern Turkey
Arzhan or Aržan, site of early Scythian (9th to 8th century BC) kurgan burials in the Tuva Republic, Russia
Arzan Nagwaswalla, Indian cricketer
Lucas Arzán, Puerto Rican footballer
Arzan, village in Bulgaria